The 2011–12 Rwanda National Football League (known as the Primus National Football League for sponsorship reasons) was the 35th season of the Rwanda National Football League since it began in 1975. The league is the highest division in football in Rwanda, and the season began on 17 September 2011 and ended on 18 May 2012. Armée Patriotique Rwandaise, who began the season as the defending champions, extended their record number of titles to 13, stretching the gap between Rayon Sports' titles to 7. Nyanza and Espoir were both to be relegated at the end of the season, but due to the former's sponsors moving to Rayon Sports, they had to withdraw from the league and therefore the latter took their place.

Clubs

A total of 13 teams competed for the title in this season.

League table

Results

References

Rwanda
Rwanda National Football League seasons
football
football